Kari is a village in Jhunjhunu district of Rajasthan state in India. It is situated 17 km west of Nawalgarh and is connected to nearby cities such as Jhunjhunu and Gudha by roads. It is a 4000 -year-old village. Pareek's are said to be the first inhabitants of the village.

The postal pincode for the village is 333305.

Population 
The total village population is 5649 (2001 census). Most of the villagers are Hindus. 10 percent of the villagers are Harijans, 8% are Brahmins and 1% are Muslims.  Moond family, Maanth, Dhayal, Dhaka, Shivran, Khedar, pujari Rayal, Achara, Doot, Mahala, Dudi, Pachar, Bhaskar, Gilla, Kuri, Godara are the Jat Gotras in the village. The Rathore Rajputs (Jodha Gotra) also live in this village.

Economy 
60% of the villagers are dependent on agriculture. 25 villagers work in Gulf countries, mostly in Saudi Arabia and 45 villagers work as teachers. Each family either has a member working in armed forces or having worked in armed forces.and many are working in other states of India 

There are 50 shops in the village.

Education 
There is a government senior secondary school in the village.
There is an English medium primary school (sarswati primary school) in the village. 
And here also many students in sport's like volliwall and cricket

References

External links 

Villages in Jhunjhunu district